La Valle Agordina is a comune (municipality) in the Province of Belluno in the Italian region Veneto, located about  north of Venice and about  northwest of Belluno.

The municipality of La Valle Agordina contains the frazioni (subdivisions, mainly villages and hamlets) Cugnago, Fadés, Lantrago, Matten, Conaggia, Chiesa, Torsas, Gaidòn, Ronche, Ronchet, Cancellade, Noàch, Le Campe, and La Muda.

La Valle Agordina borders the following municipalities: Agordo, Forno di Zoldo, Longarone, Rivamonte Agordino, Sedico, Zoldo Alto.

Territory
La Valle has a lot of mountains around itself and inside its municipality: Zelo (south), Talvena (east), the chain of San Sebastiano (northeast), a little piece of Moiazza.

From the village, other mountains are also visible outside of the municipality: Framont (northwest, Agordo), Agner (west, Agordo), Pale di San Lucano (west-northwest, Taibon Agordino), Monti del Sole (like Sun mountains, southwest, Gosaldo), Imperina (south-southwest, Rivamonte Agordino).

In La Valle's municipality there are a lot of little rivers, like Rova, Missiaga, Bordina and Val Clusa.

Demographic evolution

References

Cities and towns in Veneto